The Cavibelonia are one of the four orders of solenogaster, a kind of shell-less, worm-like mollusk.

This order is not monophyletic and is no longer accepted.

Previous families
 Acanthomeniidae
 Amphimeniidae
 Drepanomeniidae
 Epimeniidae
 Notomeniidae
 Proneomeniidae
 Pruvotinidae
 Rhipidoherpiidae
 Rhopalomeniidae
 Simrothiellidae
 Strophomeniidae
 Syngenoherpiidae

References

 Salvini-Plawen L v. (1978). Antarktische und subantarktische Solenogastres (eine Monographie: 1898-1974). Zoologica (Stuttgart) 128: 1-305

External links
 

 
Solenogastres
Obsolete animal taxa